A hip flask is a thin flask for holding liquor.

Description
Hip flasks were traditionally made of pewter, silver, or even glass, though most modern flasks are made from stainless steel. Some modern flasks are made of plastic so as to avoid detection by metal detectors.

Hip flasks can vary in shape, although they are usually contoured to match the curve of the wearer's hip or thigh for comfort and discretion in a design also known as a kidney flask. Some flasks have a "captive top", which is a small arm that attaches the top to the flask in order to stop it from getting lost when it is taken off.

A hip flask is most commonly purchased empty and then filled by the owner. However, the term "flask" also applies to smallest bottle sizes of alcohol in commercial markets. Some flasks come with small cups to make sharing easier, although generally liquid is consumed directly from the flask.

History

The hip flask began to appear in the form it is recognized today in the 18th century, initially used by members of the gentry. 

Less compact versions had been in production for several centuries. Notably, in the Middle Ages, there are several accounts of gutted fruit being used to store liquor. During the 18th century, women boarding docked British warships would smuggle gin into the ship via makeshift flasks, created from pig's bladders and hidden inside their petticoats. Following the act of prohibition in 1920s America, the state of Indiana banned the sale of cocktail shakers and hip flasks.

Antique hip flasks, particularly those made of silver, are now sought-after collector's items.

In the Royal Air Force, "hip-flask" was used as code for a revolver.

Legality (US, UK)
Many locations in the United States have laws prohibiting to carrying alcohol in open containers in public, which includes hip flasks, whether carried on one's person or in the passenger cabin or compartment of a vehicle. This does not apply in the UK, where carrying or drinking from a hip flask in public places is not illegal.

In popular culture

The hip flask appears frequently in comedy, in part because it allows drinking in inappropriate situations where a bottle would not normally be found—for instance, in Two and a Half Men, where Charlie Harper (Charlie Sheen) drinks alcohol from a hip flask during a funeral. It also appears rarely in The Simpsons, when Homer drinks from it on occasion, and even allows Bart to take a drink during particularly intolerable occasions. In Family Guy, the character Brian Griffin also carries around a hip flask in the earlier seasons. In another adult animation, Rick and Morty, the character Rick Sanchez, who is shown to be notably alcoholic, carries a hip flask under his lab coat. In the TV series Lucifer, a flask is usually carried around by the title character Lucifer Morningstar.

See also
 Canteen — similar design and function

References

External links

 Article mentioning the banning of Hip Flasks
 RAF codes
 Pocketful of Joy: An Extensive Article on the History and Etiquette of the Hip Flask
 Why are Hip Flasks Curved?
 History of Hip Flasks
Engraved Hip Flasks

Drinking culture
Packaging
Bottles